Isolde Ries (born 24 June 1956) is a German politician from the Social Democratic Party of Germany and a former member of the Food, Beverages and Catering Union. She was a member of the Landtag of Saarland from 1990 until 2022.

References

1956 births
Living people
Women members of State Parliaments in Germany
Social Democratic Party of Germany politicians
Members of the Landtag of Saarland
20th-century German women politicians
21st-century German women politicians
Women legislative speakers